Siu Lam Hospital, located in Tuen Mun, is the only hospital in Hong Kong providing comprehensive rehabilitation and infirmary services exclusively for patients with severe intellectual disability aged 16 or above.

History
Siu Lam Hospital was opened on 28 June 1972 by the Executive Councillor, Kenneth Fung Ping-fan. Originally located in Tai Lam Valley, with 200 beds, it was the first hospital to serve patients with severe intellectual disabilities in Hong Kong. It was built with a grant of HK$5.7 million from the Royal Hong Kong Jockey Club.

Services
, the hospital has 500 beds and around 411 members of staff.

References

Hospitals in Hong Kong
Intellectual disability hospitals
1972 establishments in Hong Kong
Hospitals established in 1972